KVK Zepperen is a Belgian football club from Zepperen (Sint-Truiden). The club is associated to the KBVB with number 6209 and has purple and white as their club colors.

External links 
https://web.archive.org/web/20150205152637/http://www.vkzepperen.net/

1959 establishments in Belgium
Association football clubs established in 1959
Football clubs in Belgium
Organisations based in Limburg (Belgium)